This is a list of colleges and universities with National Collegiate Athletic Association (NCAA) – sanctioned men's indoor volleyball teams that compete for either the NCAA National Collegiate Men's Volleyball Championship or the NCAA Division III Men's Volleyball Championship.

Structure
The competition structure of men's volleyball is dramatically different from that of most sports sponsored by the NCAA. In most sports, teams are divided into three divisions:
Division I, generally consisting of large or specialized universities that devote the most resources to athletics; these schools offer substantial numbers of athletic scholarships to attract team members (with a few voluntary exceptions, most notably the Ivy League).
Division II, generally consisting of smaller institutions; these schools are also allowed to offer athletic scholarships, but in substantially smaller numbers.
Division III, generally consisting of smaller schools and a few large institutions that prefer to focus on academics; schools in this group are not allowed to offer athletic scholarships

Before the 2011–12 school year (2012 championship), men's volleyball did not have an official divisional structure; even now, that structure is truncated. The National Collegiate Championship remains as the NCAA's top-level championship, but Division III members now have their own championship, officially known as the NCAA Division III Men's Volleyball Championship.

With the introduction of an official Division III championship, schools in that division are no longer eligible for the National Collegiate Championship. The last exception, Rutgers–Newark, had been a grandfathered scholarship program in men's volleyball and could compete for the National Collegiate Championship through the 2014 edition. After that season, Rutgers–Newark completed a transition to D-III men's volleyball.

This structure differs from that of the NCAA Women's Volleyball Championship, in which separate tournaments are conducted for all three divisions, mainly because there are far more NCAA member schools offering women's volleyball than the men's game. All schools that sponsor men's volleyball and are members of either Division I or II are allowed to offer financial aid for the sport that is equivalent to a maximum of 4.5 full scholarships.

Before the creation of the NCAA Division III championship in 2012, an unofficial men's volleyball championship tournament was conducted that was open only to Division III men's volleyball programs. For sponsorship reasons, it was known as the "Molten Division III Men's Invitational Volleyball Championship Tournament (Final Four)". Though it never occurred, an NCAA Division III school could, before 2012, qualify for the at-large bid to the National Collegiate Championship. Only NCAA Division III teams from the EIVA were able to earn an automatic bid.

Historically, there have been three general regions for men's volleyball: "West", "Mid-West", and "East".  Before the Big West Conference became the first Division I all-sports conference to sponsor men's volleyball in the 2017–18 school year (2018 season), each region was represented by one "major" conference (defined here as a league that includes full Division I member schools)—respectively the Mountain Pacific Sports Federation (MPSF), Midwestern Intercollegiate Volleyball Association (MIVA), and Eastern Intercollegiate Volleyball Association (EIVA).

The East Region is also represented by Conference Carolinas, a Division II all-sports conference that was the first all-sports league in either Division I or II to sponsor men's volleyball. It received an automatic berth in the National Collegiate Championship for the first time in 2014, when the championship expanded from four teams to six.

When the Big West established its men's volleyball league, it took six teams from the MPSF men's volleyball league—half of that conference's pre-2017 men's volleyball membership. However, because the MPSF retained six teams, it kept its automatic NCAA bid, and soon announced it would add two more teams for the 2018 season. With pre-split member California Baptist dropping the sport after the 2017 season, the MPSF now has seven teams. Two conferences from the "West" now earn bids.

The Southern Intercollegiate Athletic Conference (SIAC), a Division II league made up almost exclusively of historically black colleges and universities (HBCUs), originally planned to start men's volleyball competition in the 2021 season with six members, all HBCUs. COVID-19 issues led the SIAC to delay the start of men's volleyball play to the 2022 season, by which time the conference had lost one of its intended six programs but added a replacement.

Most recently, the Division I Northeast Conference (NEC) announced that it would start men's volleyball competition in the 2023 season, making it the second D-I all-sports conference to sponsor men's volleyball. The NEC initially announced that its new league would feature six programs, all representing full NEC members. Fairleigh Dickinson and LIU had started competition in the 2022 season as independents; transitional D-I member Merrimack would start a new varsity program in 2023; and Sacred Heart, St. Francis Brooklyn, and Saint Francis (PA) moved from the EIVA. The EIVA retained six members and with it its automatic NCAA tournament bid. Shortly after the end of the 2022 season, the NEC announced that two D-II schools that had previously played as independents, Daemen and D'Youville (the latter then a transitional D-II member), would become single-sport NEC associates.

In Division III, the conference alignment radically changed with the creation of that division's NCAA championship. Before the 2012 season, the majority of the Division III schools with men's volleyball programs were members of the North East Collegiate Volleyball Association (NECVA). Other Division III schools were members of other leagues, among them the New England Collegiate Conference, and the Eastern College Athletic Conference (ECAC). Teams from the ECAC were members of the NECVA. After the NCAA announced the creation of the D-III championship, the NECVA disbanded after the 2011 season. Two all-sports conferences whose men's volleyball programs had previously formed NECVA divisions—the CUNY Athletic Conference and Great Northeast Athletic Conference—began officially sponsoring the sport. Two other D-III all sports conferences, the United East Conference (then known as the North Eastern Athletic Conference) and Skyline Conference, also started sponsoring men's volleyball. The volleyball-only United Volleyball Conference was founded in 2010 in advance of the establishment of the NCAA D-III championship; another volleyball-only circuit, the Continental Volleyball Conference (CVC), was formed the following year. In 2014, the CVC amicably split along regional lines, with the Eastern members retaining the conference name (plus their automatic bid to the D-III championship) and the Midwestern members forming the new Midwest Collegiate Volleyball League. The Allegheny Mountain Collegiate Conference, Middle Atlantic Conference, and Northern Athletics Collegiate Conference all began sponsoring men's volleyball in the 2018 season. The New Jersey Athletic Conference added the sport in the 2019 season, but did not sponsor it beyond that season after all of its men's volleyball members moved that sport to other leagues. The College Conference of Illinois and Wisconsin and Colonial States Athletic Conference started men's volleyball competition in the 2020 season.

Members of the National Association of Intercollegiate Athletics (NAIA), a separate athletics governing body whose members are primarily smaller institutions, regularly play matches against NCAA teams.

Because of the historic lack of an official divisional structure in men's volleyball, four of the five major conferences have member schools that normally participate in NCAA Division II. This was also true for the other major conference until the 2021 season.
 The 7-member MPSF men's volleyball league, otherwise made up entirely of Division I schools, has one Division II member, with Concordia–Irvine having joined from the independent ranks for the 2018 season. The conference had two D-II members in the 2017 season, California Baptist and UC San Diego, but California Baptist dropped the sport after that season and UC San Diego left to join the new Big West men's volleyball league.
 The eight members of the MIVA consist of four full Division I members, one transitional D-I member, and three Division II members. The transitional D-I member is Lindenwood, which started its transition in July 2022. It remains in the MIVA, being the only member of its all-sports conference, the Ohio Valley Conference, to sponsor men's volleyball. Another school that started a transition to D-I in 2022, Queens (NC), will join the MIVA for the 2024 season.
 Like the MPSF, the 6-member EIVA consists entirely of D-I members save for one Division II school, namely Charleston (WV). Through the 2014 season, the EIVA included Rutgers–Newark, the only remaining Division III school competing for the National Collegiate Championship, until that school completed its transition to Division III men's volleyball after that season.
 The Big West, the first Division I all-sports conference to sponsor men's volleyball, launched its league with six teams—five full conference members plus D-II UC San Diego. With UCSD starting a transition to D-I in July 2020 and becoming an all-sports Big West member, the Big West is the only major men's volleyball conference consisting entirely of D-I members.
 The NEC's originally announced lineup for its first men's volleyball season in 2023 featured only D-I members (including transitional member Merrimack). Before the NEC league began play, it expanded from 6 to 8 with the addition of D-II members Daemen and D'Youville.

The sizes of the conferences have fluctuated over the years as new men's volleyball programs arise and other programs are dropped from their schools. The creation of the men's Division III national championship led to several D-III schools leaving the EIVA.

Through 2013, each of the three major conferences of that day (MPSF, MIVA and EIVA) received an automatic bid to the Final Four with one additional at-large bid.  The remaining bid was an at-large bid that could be awarded to any team in Division I or II (which included Rutgers–Newark through the 2014 season). With Conference Carolinas receiving its first automatic berth in the 2014 season, the tournament expanded to six teams—the four conference champions, plus two at-large teams. The top two seeds received byes into the Final Four and the remaining four teams played for places in the Final Four. The tournament expanded further to seven teams for the 2018 season, coinciding with the Big West adding men's volleyball. The Big West receives an automatic bid, and two at-large teams continue to earn tournament entries. The 2018 National Collegiate tournament introduced a "play-in" match involving the two lowest seeds in the field; from that point, the tournament format is identical to the one used from 2014 to 2017. Generally, the best teams not receiving an automatic bid (usually from one of the now four major conferences) receive the at-large bids.

Current programs

All affiliations are current for the ongoing 2023 NCAA men's volleyball season. All years listed refer to men's volleyball seasons; since NCAA men's volleyball is a spring sport, any team listed as joining a new conference in the future will actually join in the calendar year before beginning competition in the new league.

National Collegiate (Divisions I & II) programs

+=1 bid vacated by NCAA

Division III programs

Future programs

National Collegiate

Division III

See also
NCAA men's volleyball tournament (National Collegiate division)
NCAA Division III men's volleyball tournament
NCAA Women's Volleyball Championship
List of NCAA Division I women's volleyball programs

Notes

External links
NCAA Division I Men's Volleyball
NCAA Division III Men's Volleyball

Men's volleyball
NCAA volleyball
College men's volleyball in the United States
Volleyball competitions in the United States
NCAA men